Best of Enemies is a British comedy television series which first aired on ITV between 6 August 1968 and 16 July 1969. Rival Conservative and Labour MP's are forced to share an office in the Houses of Parliament. The two characters are inversions of their stereotypes with the Tory a more modest man who rides a bicycle while his Labour counterpart drives an expensive jaguar. Coote had already portrayed an MP in the 1967 series The Whitehall Worrier, with which it shared a gentler humour.

All episodes are believed to be lost.

Cast
 Robert Coote as  Willie Gordon MP
 Tim Barrett as Geoffrey Broom MP
 Deryck Guyler as Wilkins
 Jay Denyer as Policeman
 Ann Lancaster as  Mrs. Ewing
 Geoffrey Palmer as Johnson
 Jill Dixon as Rowena Gordon
 Angela Ryder as Miss Fifi

References

Bibliography
 Steven Fielding. A State of Play: British Politics on Screen, Stage and Page, from Anthony Trollope to The Thick of It. A&C Black, 2014.

External links
 

ITV sitcoms
1968 British television series debuts
1969 British television series endings
1960s British comedy television series
English-language television shows